Újtikos is a village in Hajdú-Bihar county, in the Northern Great Plain region of eastern Hungary.

Geography

Populated places in Hajdú-Bihar County